Danko Kiković (born 21 September 1994) is a Serbian footballer who plays as a midfielder for Novi Pazar.

Career

In 2013, Kiković joined the youth academy of Porto, one of Portugal's most successful clubs.

In 2015, he signed for BSK in the Serbian second division, where he made 40 league appearances and scored 4 goals, before joining Žarkovo.

Before the second half of the 2020–21 season, Kiković signed for Serbian top flight side Novi Pazar.

References

External links
 

1994 births
Footballers from Belgrade
Living people
Serbian footballers
Association football midfielders
FK BSK Borča players
FK Javor Ivanjica players
FK Mladost Lučani players
FK Inđija players
OFK Žarkovo players
FK Novi Pazar players
Serbian SuperLiga players
Serbian First League players
Serbian expatriate footballers
Expatriate footballers in Portugal
Serbian expatriate sportspeople in Portugal